Welch, Welch's, Welchs or Welches may refer to:

People
Welch (surname)

Places
Welch, Oklahoma, a town, US
Welches, Oregon, an unincorporated community, US
Welch, Texas, an unincorporated community, US
Welchs, Virginia, an unincorporated community, US
Welch, West Virginia, a city, US
Welch Township, Goodhue County, Minnesota, US
Welch Township, Cape Girardeau County, Missouri, US
Welch Mountains, Palmer Land, Antarctica
Welch Peak, British Columbia, Canada
Welch Peaks, Washington, US
Welch Island (disambiguation)
Welch Rocks, north of Welch Island, Antarctica
2405 Welch, an asteroid

In the military
Welch Regiment or The Welch, a former British Army regiment
Welch's Regiment of Militia, a unit in the Continental Army during the American Revolutionary War
USS Welch, the name of a patrol craft and a gunboat

Other uses
Welch's, US brand of fruit-based products
An archaic spelling of Welsh
Welch baronets, a title in the Baronetage of the United Kingdom
Welch College, Gallatin, Tennessee, a private four-year college
Welch Training School, New Haven, Connecticut, on the National Register of Historic Places
Welch Hall (disambiguation), various buildings
Francis G. Welch Stadium, a sports stadium in Emporia, Kansas
Welch Motor Car Company

See also
Welch method, a method of estimating the power of a signal vs. frequency
Welch's t test, a statistical test
Welsh (disambiguation)